There is a body of films that are set on the planet Mars. In the late 19th century, people erroneously believed that there were canals on Mars. Into the early 20th century, additional observations of Mars fed people's interest in what was called "Mars fever". One of the earliest films to be set on Mars was the short film A Trip to Mars (1910), which was produced by one of Thomas Edison's film companies. In the 1920s through the 1960s, more films featured Mars or extraterrestrial Martians. In the 1960s and 1970s, the Mariner program and the Viking program revealed new scientific details about Mars that showed little prospect for life. The Guardian said, "These disappointing discoveries changed the place of Mars on humanity's mental map. Films began to reflect this." Films such as Total Recall (1990) and Red Planet (2000) focused more on the colonization of Mars by humans.

The Guardian, reporting on the release of John Carter (2012), said, since 1995, six films featuring Mars performed poorly at the box office. Wired, reporting on the release of The Martian (2015), said prior films set on Mars—Red Planet, Mission to Mars (2000), and The Last Days on Mars (2013)—were "notable flops" that were the most recent in a "dismal track record of Mars movies". The Atlantic called The Martian "the subgenre's newest and best entry", citing the positive reviews and strong box office returns on opening weekend. It said, "Many films seek to dramatize the Red Planet’s harsh landscape as a romantic frontier, but The Martian is one that actually succeeds."

List of films
The following films are listed alphabetically. The list can be sorted chronologically by clicking the diamond shape which follows the word "Year":

See also
 Mars in fiction
 Moon in fiction § Film

Related television
 Away, a 2020 science fiction drama streaming television series
 Cowboy Bebop, a 1998 Japanese animated television series predominantly set on Mars, post-terraformation
 Babylon 5 (season 4) – TV series with several season 4 episodes set on Mars
 The Expanse, a 2016 television series featuring a colonized solar system in which Earth and an independent Mars compete for the resources of the asteroid belt
 The First, 2018 drama series
 Mars, a 2016 six-part docudrama television miniseries by National Geographic
 The Martian Chronicles, a 1980 television miniseries
 Missions, a 2017 French television series
 Race to Mars, a 2007 television miniseries

Indirectly related films
 Abbott and Costello Go to Mars, a 1953 film in which the comedy duo end up on Venus instead of Mars
 Capricorn One, a 1977 government conspiracy thriller film about a Mars landing hoax

References

Further reading

 
Mars